opened near  in Kyoto, Japan, in 1998. The collection, begun by Osaka industrialist , numbers some one thousand pieces including thirty Important Cultural Properties, ranging from haniwa and tea utensils to paintings of the Heian and Kamakura periods as well as by Itō Jakuchū and Katsushika Hokusai. These are exhibited on a rotating basis with four or five exhibitions each year.

See also
 Kyoto National Museum
 Heian Jingū

References

External links
  Hosomi Museum
  Hosomi Museum

Museums in Kyoto
Museums established in 1998
1998 establishments in Japan